This is a list of notable athletes and well-known Lethwei practitioners who competed, sorted by area of place of birth.

Myanmar 
  Tun Tun Min
  Saw Nga Man
  Lone Chaw
  Shwe Sai
  Too Too
  Tun Lwin Moe
  Soe Lin Oo
  Mite Yine
  Saw Ba Oo
  Kyar Ba Nyein
  Nilar Win
  Wan Chai
  Tway Ma Shaung
  Win Tun

Canada 
  Dave Leduc

United States 
  Cyrus Washington

Europe 
  Artur Saladiak
  Sasha Moisa
  Julija Stoliarenko

Asia 
  Naimjon Tuhtaboyev
  Nguyễn Trần Duy Nhất
  Akitoshi Tamura

Athletes who competed in Lethwei at least once 
  Saiyok Pumpanmuang
  Nilmungkorn Sudsakorngym
  Pakorn P.K. Saenchai Muaythaigym
  Diesellek TopkingBoxing
  Iquezang Kor.Rungthanakeat
  Singmanee Kaewsamrit
  Detrit Sathian Gym
  Berneung TopkingBoxing
  Chanajon P.K. Saenchai Muaythaigym
  Pongsiri P.K.Saenchaimuaythaigym
  Avatar Tor.Morsri
  Umar Semata
  Corentin Jallon
  Seth Baczynski
  Doug Evans
  Shannon Ritch
  Shunichi Shimizu
  Yuichiro Nagashima
  Hartley Jackson

Literature 
 Maung Gyi, Burmese bando boxing, Ed. R.Maxwell, Baltimore, 1978
 Zoran Rebac, Traditional Burmese boxing, Ed. Paladin Press, Boulder, 2003

See also

 Lethwei
 Bando
 Naban

References

Lethwei practitioners
Lethwei